The Latino Greek Movement seen on college campuses in the United States (excluding Puerto Rico) was at the Rensselaer Polytechnic Institute (RPI), in Troy, New York in 1898 when a group of Latin American students organized the Union Hispano Americana (UHA) as a cultural and intellectual secret society based on the ideology of Pan-Americanism. The UHA eventually became Phi Iota Alpha.

In New Jersey on December 1, 1975, Lambda Theta Phi Latin Fraternity, Inc. was founded at Kean University in Union New Jersey. With its birth, Lambda Theta Phi became the one of many organization to serve the Latino community in the United States. With the organizations second chapter at Rutgers University-New Brunswick in the fall of 1978, Lambda Theta Phi was well on its way to growing the Latino Greek movement. A Latina sorority was established soon after Lambda Theta Phi at Kean University as well. Lambda Theta Alpha Latin Sorority, Inc. became the first Latina Greek-lettered organization in the country. Both of these Greek-lettered organizations saw the Latino Greek Movement's infancy days. The movement was created in the state of New Jersey with the establishment of other organizations.

On the campus of Rutgers University- Livingston campus, Latino Siempre Unidos, Lambda Sigma Upsilon Latino Fraternity, Inc. on April 5, 1979 was created. Corazones Unidos Siempre, Chi Upsilon Sigma National Latin Sorority, Inc. was also founded at Rutgers University - New Brunswick on April 29, 1980. All four organizations were created to provide the Latino community on campus and the United States a voice.

In 1982, Lambda Upsilon Lambda became the first Latino-based fraternity to be chartered at an Ivy League institution.

References

Social movements in North America